Mediterranean Food is a 2009 Spanish comedy film directed by Joaquín Oristrell.

Cast 
 Olivia Molina - Sofía
 Paco León - Toni
 Alfonso Bassave - Frank
 Carmen Balagué - Loren
  - Ramón
  - Pepe Ripoll
 Jordi Martínez - Padrastro Frank
 Usun Yoon - Hoshi
  - Lunes

See also 
 List of Spanish films of 2009

References

External links 

2009 comedy films
2009 films
Spanish comedy films
2000s Spanish films